Andrew Otto is an American retired ice hockey defenseman who was an All-American for Clarkson.

Career
Otto began attending Clarkson University after being selected by the New York Rangers in the NHL Draft. During his freshman season, he was selected to participate at the 1983 World Junior Ice Hockey Championships. In his time with Clarkson, Otto was a decent player, helping the team make the NCAA Tournament as a sophomore and nearly overcame a 4-goal deficit against Minnesota–Duluth in the quarterfinals.

Otto was named team captain in his senior season and led all defensemen in scoring. He was named an All-American and, while the team's regular season wasn't much different than years past, Clarkson defeated top-seeded Harvard to make their first championship game in fifteen years. the Knights ultimately lost the match and did not receive an at-large bid to the national tournament. Otto finished out the year with a single game for the New Haven Nighthawks.

Rather than stay in North America, Otto travelled to the Netherlands to continue his hockey career. He joined the newly formed Rotterdam Panda's and helped the team win the Eredivisie championship in 1987. He played for HC Auronzo in the Italian second league the following season before returning to the Panda's and helping the club win two more championships in 1989 and 1990. Otto remained with the team for three more years before the closure of their home rink put the club in dire financial circumstances.

Otto returned as a player eleven years later in the Eerste Divisie, the semi-professional second Dutch league. part way through the next season he was sent down to the Tweede Divisie (Dutch third league) and continued to play at the level until the COVID-19 pandemic caused the league to suspended operations in 2020.

Statistics

Regular season and playoffs

International

Awards and honors

References

External links

1963 births
Living people
AHCA Division I men's ice hockey All-Americans
American men's ice hockey defensemen
Ice hockey players from Illinois
Sportspeople from Park Ridge, Illinois
New York Rangers draft picks
Clarkson Golden Knights men's ice hockey players
New Haven Nighthawks players
Rotterdam Panda's players